Alvord Hot Springs is a geothermal spring located in Harney County in southeastern Oregon in the United States.

Geography
The spring lies at  elevation on the western edge of the Alvord Desert into which the spring flows and eventually evaporates.

Soaking pools
The source averages 174 °F (79 °C), but a system of pipes cools and regulates the flow of incoming water so that the pool temperature is maintained about 105 °F (44 °C).  The spring smells somewhat of sulfur, yet not enough to dissuade visitors from soaking in the small, man-made rectangular concrete soaking pool which is 3 feet (1 m) deep and either 25 by 50 feet (7.5 x 15 m)
or 10 by 20 (3 x 6 m).
The soaking pool has a covered, as well as an open portion, the covered portion being rustic in its corrugated sheet metal and wood construction.

Public access
Though they are on private property, before 2013, the use of the hot springs was free and open to the public year-round.
In early 2013 the property owners (the Alvord Ranch) installed a full-time caretaker in a trailer and started construction of a parking-lot and a small building which will house a store.  Access to the hot springs are no longer free. Maintenance is volunteered by local residents and all visitors are encouraged to help keep the springs clean.

References 

Hot springs of Oregon
Bodies of water of Harney County, Oregon